The Theme of Dyrrhachium or Dyrrhachion was a Byzantine military-civilian province (theme), covering the Adriatic coast of modern Albania, and some coastal regions of modern Montenegro. It was established in the early 9th century and named after its capital, Dyrrhachium (modern Durrës).

History
J.B. Bury proposed its creation alongside the themes of the Peloponnese and Cephallenia in the early 9th century, with the historian Jadran Ferluga putting the date of its establishment in the reign of Emperor Nikephoros I. Its boundaries are not very clear. To the north, it abutted the Theme of Dalmatia and the Serbian principality of Duklja, and the Theme of Nicopolis to the south. The theme covered the coast in between, but how far inland it extended is uncertain: according to Konstantin Jireček, it reached as far as Drivast and Pulati in the north, and Berat in the centre, and bordered the Slav-inhabited lands of the Upper Devoll and Ohrid in the south. During the Byzantine–Bulgarian wars of the late 10th and early 11th centuries, the city seems to have been autonomous or at times under Bulgarian suzerainty.

From the mid-11th century on, its governor held the title of doux or katepano. In 1040–1041, the troops of the theme, under their leader Tihomir, rebelled and joined the revolt of Peter Delyan.

During the late 11th and the 12th centuries, the city of Dyrrhachium and its province were of great importance to the Byzantine Empire. The city was the "key of Albania" and the main point of entry for trade but also for invaders from Italy, and was ideally placed to control the actions of the Slavic rulers of the western Balkans. Thus the doux of Dyrrhachium became the senior-most Byzantine authority throughout the western Balkan provinces. Two successive governors, Nikephoros Bryennios the Elder and Nikephoros Basilakes, used this post as a launchpad for their imperial ambitions in the late 1070s. The region also played a crucial role in the Byzantine–Norman Wars, being occupied by the Normans in 1081–1084. After its recovery, Emperor Alexios I Komnenos entrusted the command of the theme to some of his closest relatives. Nevertheless, the city magnates (archontes) retained considerable influence and autonomy of action throughout, and it was they who in 1205, after the sack of Constantinople by the Fourth Crusade, surrendered the city to the Venetians.

During the existence of the theme, Dyrrhachium was also the main ecclesiastical center in the region. As attested by the Notitiae Episcopatuum and other sources, local episcopal sees in the province were grouped under jurisdiction of the Metropolitanate of Dyrrhachium, that belonged to the Patriarchate of Constantinople.

List of known governors
 Unnamed strategos of Dyrrhachium during Leo Choirosphaktes' embassy to Bulgaria (896/904)
 Leo Rhabdouchos, protospatharios and strategos of Dyrrhachium in 917
 Constantine, imperial spatharios and strategos of Dyrrhachium (8th/9th-century seal)
 Niketas Pegonites, patrikios and strategos of Dyrrhachium until 1018
 Eustathios Daphnomeles, strategos of Dyrrhachium from 1018
 Basil Synadenos, strategos of Dyrrhachium until 
 Michael Dermokaites, strategos of Dyrrhachium from 
 Michael, patrikios and katepano of Dyrrhachium 
 Perenos, doux of Dyrrhachium 
 Michael Maurex, vestarches and katepano of Dyrrhachium (seal dated to the 1060s/early 1070s)
 Nikephoros Bryennios the Elder, doux of Dyrrhachium in 1075–1077
 Nikephoros Basilakes, protoproedros and doux of Dyrrhachium in 1078
 George Monomachatos, doux of Dyrrhachium in 1078–1081
 George Palaiologos, 1081
 John Doukas, doux of Dyrrhachium in 1085–1092
 John Komnenos, sebastos and doux of Dyrrhachium in 1092–1106
 Alexios Komnenos, 1106 – after 1108
 Pirogordus [Pyrrogeorgios?], doux of Dyrrhachium early in the reign of John II Komnenos and George I of Duklja
 Alexios Kontostephanos, doux of Dyrrhachium in the second quarter of the 12th century, during the reign of John II Komnenos and George I of Duklja
 Alexios Bryennios, doux of Dyrrhachium and Ohrid, probably sometime between 1148 and 1156 
 Alexios Doukas, mid-12th century
 Constantine Doukas, 
 Unnamed doux of Dyrrhachium in 1203

References

Sources 

 
 

 

 

 

History of Durrës
Themes of the Byzantine Empire
Albania under the Byzantine Empire
Medieval Montenegro
States and territories established in the 9th century
States and territories disestablished in the 13th century